The Frisian–Frankish wars were a series of conflicts between the Frankish Empire and the Frisian kingdom in the 7th and 8th centuries.

The wars were mainly about control of the Rhine delta. After the death of the Frisian king Redbad, the Franks gained the upper hand. In 734 at the Battle of the Boarn the Frisians were defeated and the Franks annexed the Frisian lands between the Vlie and the Lauwers. Only the Frisians east of the Lauwers remained independent. In 772 they lost their independence as well. The wars ended with the last uprising of the Frisians in 793 and the pacification of the Frisians by Charlemagne.

Background
The displacements of peoples during the Migration Period resulted in the Frisian settlements in the north and the west of the Low Countries the Saxons in the east, the Warnen at the mouth of the Rhine and the Franks further south around the Scheldt. There, under the leadership of their Merovingian kings, they had an important role in the politics in northern Gaul.

The Frisians consisted of loosely bonded tribes centered on war bands but without great power. In the second half of the 7th century the Frisian kingdom reached its maximum geographic development. The Frisian kings became interested in former Frankish lands; under the leadership of the predecessors of Aldgisl they expanded their power to the heart of the Low Countries. The presence of the Warnen at the mouth of the Rhine remains unclear, but it appears they were likely crushed between the Frisians and Franks.

Rhine delta control
The Merovingian king of Neustria Chilperic I (561–584) is mentioned in Frankish sources as the "terror of the Frisians and the Suebi". There is some numismatic evidence that around 600 the Frisians were successful in a war led by their king Audulf (with coins stating VICTVRIA AVDVLFO, "victory to Audulf", and AVDVLFVS FRISIA, "Audulf of Frisia", being minted between 579 and 630), although whether they fought against the Franks is uncertain.

By 630 the situation had changed. The Merovingian king Dagobert I brought the Frankish Empire under one banner again and conquered the lands south of the Oude Rijn. This time they brought Christianity to the Frisian lands and built a church in Utrecht. After Dagobert died the Franks could not hold their position there, and around 650 the central river area, including Dorestad became Frisian again. The manufacturing of Frankish coins stopped and the city of Utrecht became the residence of the Frisian kings.

Under the rule of King Aldgisl the Frisians came into conflict with the Neustrian mayor of the palace Ebroin (675-681). This time the conflict was about the old Roman border fortifications. Aldgisl kept the Franks at a bay with his army maneuvers. In 678 he welcomed the English bishop Wilfrid, who like him was not a friend of Ebroin.

Under the successor of Aldgisl, Redbad, the tide turned in favour of the Franks; by 689 Neustria, Austrasia and Burgundy were united under mayor of the palace Pepin of Herstal. In 690 Pepin was victorious in the battle of Dorestad. Though not all the consequences of this battle are clear, Dorestad became Frankish again, as did the castles of Utrecht and Fechten. It is thought that the influence of the Franks now extended from south of the Oude Rijn to the coast, but this is not entirely clear because the Frisians did not entirely lose control over the central river area. In any case there was an Archbishopric or bishopric of the Frisians founded for Willibrord and a marriage was held between Grimoald the Younger the oldest son of Pepin, and Thiadsvind, the daughter of Redbad in 711.

After Pepin died in 714, Redbad took part in the battle for succession in Frankish lands. He concluded a treaty with the new Neustrian mayor of the palace Ragenfrid and in 716 their armies entered Austrasian territory as far as Cologne, where they were victorious in the Battle of Cologne. In this way all lands south of the Rhine became Frisian again. The army returned to the north with much war loot. Redbad made plans to invade the Frankish empire for the second time and mobilised a large army. But before he could do this he fell ill and died in the autumn of 719.

After the battle of Soissons (718) Neustria and Austrasia were reunited under  Mayor of the Palace Charles Martel and nominal king Chilperic II. It is not certain who the successor of Redbad was. It is believed that there were troubles with the succession, because the Frankish opponent Charles Martel easily invaded Frisia and subjugated the territory. The resistance was so weak that Charles Martel not only annexed Frisia Citerior ("nearer" Frisia south of the Rhine), but he also crossed the Rhine and annexed "farther" Frisia, to the banks of the river Vlie.

The end of independent Frisia
In 733, Charles Martel sent an army against the Frisians. The Frisian king Poppo was defeated and his army pushed back to Eastergoa. The next year, Charles ferried an army across the Almere with a fleet that enabled him to sail up to De Boarn. The Frisians were defeated in Battle of the Boarn that followed, and their king, Poppo, was killed. The victors plundered and burned non-Christian sanctuaries. Charles Martel returned with much loot, and broke the power of the Frisian kings for good. The Franks annexed the Frisian lands between the Vlie and the Lauwers.

Annexation of East Frisia
The Frankish king Charlemagne brought an end to the independence of the Frisians east of the Lauwers as well, expanding the Frankish Empire further to the east. The war began with a campaign against the East Frisians and was then continued against the Saxons, where the Saxon Wars would last thirty-two years.

In 772, Charles attacked the Frisians east of the Lauwers and the Saxons with a large army. He defeated them in several battles and so the last independent Frisian lands and the lands of the Saxons came into Frankish hands.

Frisian uprisings
After their defeat, the Frisians rebelled against the Franks several times.

Murder of Saint Boniface

The first Frisian bishop Boniface set out for Frisia in 754 with a small retinue. He baptized a great number and summoned a general meeting for confirmation at a place not far from Dokkum, between Franeker and Groningen. Instead of the converts he expected, a group of armed inhabitants appeared. The Frisian warriors were angry because he had destroyed their shrines. They slew the aged archbishop because, according to Boniface's hagiographer, they believed the chests he carried with him contained gold and other riches. They were dismayed when they discovered that the chest only contained the bishop's books.

Uprising of 782-785
Under the leadership of Widukind the Saxons continued to resist the Franks. In 782 the Frisians east of the Lauwers also began an uprising against the Franks. The uprising expanded to Frisian lands in the west that had been pacified earlier. This led to an en masse return to paganism by the population. Marauders burned churches and the priests, including Ludger, had to flee south.

In response Charlemagne organized a new campaign in 783 to restore control, first over the Saxons and later over the Frisians. The Frisians aided Widukind against the Franks in 784 by sending him an army. It did not help much and he had to surrender in 785 and the Frisian uprising was severely repressed by the Franks.

Uprising of 793
In 793 the Frisians rebelled for the last time against Charlemagne. The reason for this was the forceful recruiting of Frisians and Saxons for the war against the Avars in the east. Under the leadership of dukes Unno and Eilrad, an uprising arose east of the Lauwers and spread to other Frisian lands. This led to a temporary return to paganism, and again priests had to flee.
This uprising was also suppressed by the Franks.

References

Wars involving Frisia
Wars involving Germanic peoples
Wars of the Middle Ages
7th-century conflicts
8th-century conflicts
Francia
Persecution of Pagans